Zhu Weiwei (born 22 May 1990) is a Chinese rower. She was born in Changzhou. She competed in double sculls together with Wang Min at the 2012 Summer Olympics in London, where they placed fourth.

References

External links

1990 births
Living people
Sportspeople from Changzhou
Chinese female rowers
Olympic rowers of China
Rowers at the 2012 Summer Olympics
Rowers at the 2016 Summer Olympics
Sportspeople from Jiangsu